François Lamy (born 31 October 1959) is a French politician who, until his appointment as Junior Minister for Urban Affairs at the newly created Ministry of Territorial Equality and Housing by President François Hollande on 16 May 2012, was a member of the National Assembly of France where he represented the 6th constituency of Essonne on behalf of the Socialist Party.

He is a close adviser of Martine Aubry, and was her campaign manager in the primary election to choose the Socialist Party's candidate for the French presidential election of 2012.

References

External links
Lamy's personal blog 

1959 births
Living people
Socialist Party (France) politicians
People from Essonne
Deputies of the 12th National Assembly of the French Fifth Republic
Deputies of the 13th National Assembly of the French Fifth Republic
Deputies of the 14th National Assembly of the French Fifth Republic